Raymond Kenton Musgrave (born September 7, 1927) is a Senior United States Judge of the United States Court of International Trade.

Education and career

Musgrave was born in 1927 in Clearwater, Florida. From 1945 to 1946, he attended the Georgia Institute of Technology and from 1946 to 1947, he attended the University of Florida. He received a Bachelor of Arts degree in 1948 from the University of Washington. He received a Juris Doctor in 1953 from Emory University School of Law. He served as assistant general counsel for Lockheed Aircraft and Lockheed International from 1953 to 1962. He served as vice president and general counsel of Mattel Inc. from 1963 to 1971. He was director of Ringling Brothers and Barnum & Bailey Combined Shows, Inc. from 1968 to 1972. He worked in private practice from 1972 to 1975. He served as assistant general counsel for Pacific Enterprises from 1975 to 1981. He served as vice president, general counsel and secretary of Vivitar Corporation from 1981 to 1985. He served as vice president and director of Santa Barbara Applied Research Corp. from 1982 to 1987.

While in college, he served two years in the Reserve Officers Training Corps but saw no military service.

Trade Court service

On July 1, 1987, President Reagan nominated Musgrave to serve as a Judge of the United States Court of International Trade, to the seat vacated by Judge Morgan Ford. He was confirmed by the United States Senate on November 6, 1987 and received his commission on November 9, 1987. He took senior status on November 14, 1997, and was succeeded by Judge Richard K. Eaton.

References

Sources

External links
 Senior Judge R. Kenton Musgrave Biography on U.S. Court of International Trade website

1927 births
Emory University School of Law alumni
Judges of the United States Court of International Trade
Living people
People from Clearwater, Florida
University of Washington alumni
20th-century American judges
Georgia Tech alumni
University of Florida alumni
United States federal judges appointed by Ronald Reagan